Stanley James Grenz (1950–2005) was an American Christian theologian and ethicist in the Baptist tradition.

Early years
Grenz was born on 7 January 1950 in Alpena, Michigan. Grenz graduated from the University of Colorado in 1973. He then earned a Master of Divinity degree from Denver Seminary in 1976. Grenz earned his Doctor of Theology degree at University of Munich in Germany under the supervision of theologian Wolfhart Pannenberg. He was ordained to pastoral ministry on 13 June 1976. He later worked within the local church context as youth director and assistant pastor (Northwest Baptist Church, Denver, Colorado, 1971–1976), pastor (Rowandale Baptist Church, Winnipeg, Manitoba, 1979–1981), and interim pastor on several occasions. He served on many Baptist boards and agencies and also as a consulting editor of Christianity Today.

Educator
While in the pastorate (1979–1981), Grenz taught courses both at the University of Winnipeg and at Winnipeg Theological Seminary (now Providence University College and Theological Seminary). He served as Professor of Systematic Theology and Christian Ethics at the North American Baptist Seminary in Sioux Falls, South Dakota, from 1981 to 1990.

For twelve years (1990–2002), Grenz held the position of Pioneer McDonald Professor of Baptist Heritage, Theology and Ethics at Carey Theological College and at Regent College in Vancouver. After a one-year sojourn as Distinguished Professor of Theology at Baylor University and George W. Truett Theological Seminary in Waco, Texas (2002–2003), he returned to Carey in August 2003 to resume his duties as Pioneer McDonald Professor of Theology.

From 1996 to 1999 he carried an appointment as Professor of Theology and Ethics (Affiliate) at Northern Baptist Theological Seminary in Lombard, Illinois.

In fall 2004, he assumed an appointment as Professor of Theological Studies at Mars Hill Graduate School in Seattle, Washington.

Theology 
Grenz' primary contributions were made discussing how evangelical Christianity ought to relate to the world. He wrote on a wide range of subjects, from sexuality to history to basic apologetics, and was one of North America's leading evangelical voices in the late 20th century and early 21st century.

Grenz held to the main principles of Arminian theology. He held to a specific concept eternal security in which "the presence of the Spirit guarantees that the one who is truly converted will remain in faith to the end" reflecting his view of corporate election.

Personal
Married to Edna Grenz, a church musician, Grenz was the father of two children, Joel Grenz and Corina Kuban, and was grandfather to one grandchild, Anika Grace Kuban. Included in two editions of Who's Who in Religion, as well as in the 2002 edition of Who's Who in U.S. Writers, Editors and Poets, Grenz died in his sleep 12 March 2005 from a brain aneurysm in St. Paul's Hospital, Vancouver.

Selected works
 Prayer: The Cry for the Kingdom, 1988 (2005 Revised Edition)
 Sexual Ethics: A Biblical Perspective, 1990
 Revisioning Evangelical Theology: A Fresh Agenda for the 21st Century, 1993
 Women in the Church: A Biblical Theology of Women in Ministry, with Denise Muir Kjesbo, 1995
 A Primer on Postmodernism, 1996,
 Created for Community: Connecting Christian Belief With Christian Living, 1996 (1998 Second Edition)
 20th Century Theology: God & the World in a Transitional Age with Roger Olson, 1997
 Who Needs Theology?: An Invitation to the Study of God's Word – (Olson & Grenz) (1996) 
 Welcoming but Not Affirming: An Evangelical Response to Homosexuality, 1998,
 Theology for the Community of God, 2000,
 The Moral Quest: Foundation of Christian Ethics, 2000,
 Renewing the Center: Evangelical Theology in a Post-Theological Era, 2000
 Beyond Foundationalism: Shaping Theology in a Postmodern Context, with John Franke, 2000
 The Social God and the Relational Self: A Trinitarian Theology of the Imago Dei, 2001,
 Rediscovering the Triune God: The Trinity in Contemporary Theology'', 2004

See also

 Amillennialism
 Evangelical left

Notes and references

Citations

Sources

External links

1950 births
2005 deaths
American Baptist theologians
Baptists from Michigan
Baylor University faculty
Christian ethicists
Deaths from intracranial aneurysm
Ludwig Maximilian University of Munich alumni
People from Alpena, Michigan
Academic staff of Regent College
Systematic theologians
University of Colorado alumni
Academic staff of University of Winnipeg
Writers from Sioux Falls, South Dakota
20th-century Baptist ministers from the United States